The 2020–21 Toronto Raptors season was the 26th season of the franchise in the National Basketball Association (NBA). The 2019–20 Raptors finished the season with a 53–19 record (in a shortened season due to the COVID-19 pandemic), and lost in the Conference Semifinals to the Boston Celtics.

For the  season, the Raptors played a shortened 72-game season, as the season start was delayed until December.  The Raptors needed a temporary home arena as a result of travel restrictions placed by the Canadian government due to the COVID-19 pandemic. On November 20, the Raptors announced that they would be beginning the 2020–21 season at Amalie Arena in Tampa, Florida, (the home of the National Hockey League's Tampa Bay Lightning); they also considered the Bridgestone Arena in Nashville (home of the Nashville Predators), the KeyBank Center in Buffalo (home of the Buffalo Sabres), the T-Mobile Center in Kansas City, the Prudential Center in Newark (home of the New Jersey Devils), or the KFC Yum! Center in Louisville (home of the Louisville Cardinals). This would be the first season since 1995 (prior to the expansion of the Raptors and Vancouver Grizzlies) not to have NBA regular-season games played in Canada following the Raptors' announcement on February 11, 2021 that they will finish the 2020–21 season in Tampa, as a result of further border restrictions. It was also the first time since 2007 an NBA team has been temporarily displaced from their home city since the New Orleans Hornets were relocated to Oklahoma City due to the damage inflicted by Hurricane Katrina on stadiums in 2005.

The Raptors struggled with injuries throughout the season. On May 10, the Raptors were eliminated from playoff contention, ending their seven-year playoff streak and suffered their worst record since the 2011–12 season. This was the first season under Nurse where the Raptors missed the playoffs.

This was the final season as a Raptor for longtime point guard and six-time NBA All-Star Kyle Lowry, who signed with the Miami Heat in August 2021.

Draft

The Raptors held one first-round pick and one second-round pick in the draft. Because the Raptors had the second-best record in the league, their selections were made at 29th in the first and second round, respectively. With the 29th pick, they selected Malachi Flynn. With the 59th pick, they selected Jalen Harris.

Roster

Standings

Division

Conference

Notes
 z – Clinched home court advantage for the entire playoffs
 c – Clinched home court advantage for the conference playoffs
 y – Clinched division title
 x – Clinched playoff spot
 pb – Clinched play-in spot
 o – Eliminated from playoff contention
 * – Division leader

Record vs opponents

(* game decided in overtime)

Game log

Preseason 

|- style="background:#cfc;"
| 1
| December 12
| @ Charlotte
| 
| Matt Thomas (16)
| Anunoby, Baynes (5)
| Thomas, VanVleet (5)
| Spectrum Center
| 1–0
|- style="background:#cfc;"
| 2
| December 14
| @ Charlotte
| 
| Fred VanVleet (23)
| Chris Boucher (8)
| Fred VanVleet (4)
| Spectrum Center
| 2–0
|- style="background:#fcc;"
| 3
| December 18
| Miami
| 
| Kyle Lowry (25)
| Pascal Siakam (9)
| Fred VanVleet (7)
| Amalie Arena
| 2–1

Regular season

|- style="background:#fcc;"
| 1
| December 23
| New Orleans
| 
| Pascal Siakam (20)
| Aron Baynes (9)
| Kyle Lowry (10)
| Amalie Arena3,800
| 0–1
|- style="background:#fcc;"
| 2
| December 26
| @ San Antonio
| 
| Fred VanVleet (27)
| Pascal Siakam (15)
| Kyle Lowry (10)
| AT&T Center0
| 0–2
|- style="background:#fcc;"
| 3
| December 29
| @ Philadelphia
| 
| Kyle Lowry (24)
| Johnson, Lowry (8)
| Kyle Lowry (9)
| Wells Fargo Center0
| 0–3
|- style="background:#cfc;"
| 4
| December 31
| New York
| 
| Fred VanVleet (25)
| Chris Boucher (9)
| Fred VanVleet (7)
| Amalie Arena3,449
| 1–3

|- style="background:#fcc;"
| 5
| January 2
| @ New Orleans
| 
| Fred VanVleet (27)
| Fred VanVleet (8)
| Kyle Lowry (8)
| Smoothie King Center750
| 1–4
|- style="background:#fcc;"
| 6
| January 4
| Boston
| 
| Fred VanVleet (35)
| Fred VanVleet (8)
| Kyle Lowry (5)
| Amalie Arena3,740
| 1–5
|- style="background:#fcc;"
| 7
| January 6
| @ Phoenix
| 
| Pascal Siakam (32)
| Lowry, Siakam (9)
| Fred VanVleet (7)
| PHX Arena0
| 1–6
|- style="background:#cfc;"
| 8
| January 8
| @ Sacramento
| 
| Fred VanVleet (34)
| Chris Boucher (10)
| Pascal Siakam (12)
| Golden 1 Center0
| 2–6
|- style="background:#fcc;"
| 9
| January 10
| @ Golden State
| 
| Pascal Siakam (25)
| Pascal Siakam (11)
| Kyle Lowry (6)
| Chase Center0
| 2–7
|- style="background:#fcc;"
| 10
| January 11
| @ Portland
| 
| Pascal Siakam (22)
| Pascal Siakam (13)
| Pascal Siakam (10)
| Moda Center0
| 2–8
|- style="background:#cfc;"
| 11
| January 14
| Charlotte
| 
| Chris Boucher (25)
| Chris Boucher (10)
| Kyle Lowry (12) 
| Amalie Arena0
| 3–8
|- style="background:#cfc;"
| 12
| January 16
| Charlotte
| 
| Norman Powell (24)
| Chris Boucher (9)
| Fred VanVleet (10)
| Amalie Arena0
| 4–8
|- style="background:#cfc;"
| 13
| January 18
| Dallas
| 
| Kyle Lowry (23)
| OG Anunoby (11)
| Kyle Lowry (7)
| Amalie Arena0
| 5–8
|- style="background:#fcc;"
| 14
| January 20
| Miami
| 
| Fred VanVleet (24)
| Kyle Lowry (10)
| Fred VanVleet (9)
| Amalie Arena0
| 5–9 
|- style="background:#cfc;"
| 15
| January 22
| Miami
| 
| Norman Powell (23)
| Pascal Siakam (14)
| Fred VanVleet (7)
| Amalie Arena0
| 6–9
|- style="background:#cfc;"
| 16
| January 24
| @ Indiana
| 
| OG Anunoby (30)
| OG Anunoby (8)
| Norman Powell (6)
| Bankers Life Fieldhouse0
| 7–9
|- style="background:#fcc;"
| 17
| January 25
| @ Indiana
| 
| Fred VanVleet (25)
| Chris Boucher (9)
| Johnson, Powell, VanVleet (6)
| Bankers Life Fieldhouse0
| 7–10
|- style="background:#fcc;"
| 18
| January 27
| Milwaukee
| 
| Norman Powell (26)
| Pascal Siakam (9)
| Fred VanVleet (10)
| Amalie Arena0
| 7–11
|- style="background:#fcc;"
| 19
| January 29
| Sacramento
| 
| Pascal Siakam (32)
| Aron Baynes (10)
| Lowry, VanVleet (6)
| Amalie Arena0
| 7–12
|- style="background:#cfc;"
| 20
| January 31
| Orlando
| 
| Pascal Siakam (30)
| Aron Baynes (16)
| Kyle Lowry (15)
| Amalie Arena0
| 8–12

|- style="background:#cfc;"
| 21
| February 2
| @ Orlando
| 
| Fred VanVleet (54)
| Kyle Lowry (10)
| Kyle Lowry (10)
| Amway Center3,211
| 9–12
|- style="background:#cfc;"
| 22
| February 5
| @ Brooklyn
| 
| Pascal Siakam (33)
| Pascal Siakam (11)
| Kyle Lowry (7)
| Barclays Center0
| 10–12
|- style="background:#fcc;"
| 23
| February 6
| @ Atlanta
| 
| Chris Boucher (29)
| Chris Boucher (10)
| Fred VanVleet (10)
| State Farm Arena991
| 10–13
|- style="background:#cfc;"
| 24
| February 8
| @ Memphis
| 
| Siakam, VanVleet (32)
| Chris Boucher (10)
| Fred VanVleet (9)
| FedExForum1,844
| 11–13
|- style="background:#cfc;"
| 25
| February 10
| @ Washington
| 
| Norman Powell (28)
| Chris Boucher (15)
| Fred VanVleet (7)
| Capital One Arena0
| 12–13
|- style="background:#fcc;"
| 26
| February 11
| @ Boston
| 
| Kyle Lowry (24)
| Aron Baynes (8)
| Fred VanVleet (11)
| TD Garden0
| 12–14
|- style="background:#fcc;"
| 27
| February 14
| Minnesota
| 
| Kyle Lowry (24)
| Pascal Siakam (8)
| Siakam, VanVleet (6)
| Amalie Arena0
| 12–15
|- style="background:#cfc;"
| 28
| February 16
| @ Milwaukee
| 
| Fred VanVleet (33)
| Pascal Siakam (13)
| Fred VanVleet (7)
| Fiserv Forum250
| 13–15
|- style="background:#cfc;"
| 29
| February 18
| @ Milwaukee
| 
| Norman Powell (29)
| Anunoby, Boucher (7)
| Fred VanVleet (8)
| Fiserv Forum500
| 14–15
|- style="background:#cfc;"
| 30
| February 19
| @ Minnesota
| 
| Norman Powell (31)
| Baynes, Siakam (9)
| Pascal Siakam (6)
| Target Center0
| 15–15
|- style="background:#cfc;"
| 31
| February 21
| Philadelphia
| 
| Siakam, VanVleet (23)
| Pascal Siakam (7)
| Fred VanVleet (9)
| Amalie Arena0
| 16–15
|- style="background:#fcc;"
| 32
| February 23
| Philadelphia
| 
| Norman Powell (24)
| Fred VanVleet (8)
| Fred VanVleet (8)
| Amalie Arena0
| 16–16
|- style="background:#fcc;"
| 33
| February 24
| @ Miami
| 
| Lowry, VanVleet (24)
| Kyle Lowry (7)
| Kyle Lowry (8)
| American Airlines Arena0
| 16–17
|- style="background:#cfc;"
| 34
| February 26
| Houston
| 
| Norman Powell (30)
| Kyle Lowry (11)
| Kyle Lowry (10)
| Amalie Arena0
| 17–17
|- style="background:#ccc;"
| —
| February 28
| Chicago
| colspan="6"|Postponed due to COVID-19. Makeup date: April 8.

|-style="background:#ccc;"
| —
| March 2
| Detroit
| colspan="6" | Postponed due to COVID-19. Makeup date: March 3.
|- style="background:#fcc"
| 35
| March 3
| Detroit
| 
| Norman Powell (36)
| Chris Boucher (8)
| Kyle Lowry (6)
| Amalie Arena0
| 17–18
|- style="background:#fcc;"
| 36
| March 4
| @ Boston
| 
| Chris Boucher (30)
| Aron Baynes (9)
| Kyle Lowry (19)
| TD Garden0
| 17–19
|- style="background:#fcc;"
| 37
| March 11
| Atlanta
| 
| Norman Powell (33)
| Aron Baynes (15)
| Kyle Lowry (12)
| Amalie Arena0
| 17–20
|- style="background:#fcc;"
| 38
| March 13
| @ Charlotte
| 
| Kyle Lowry (19)
| Henry Ellenson (9)
| Kyle Lowry (8)
| Spectrum Center2,861
| 17–21
|- style="background:#fcc;"
| 39
| March 14
| @ Chicago
| 
| Norman Powell (32)
| Baynes, Lowry (5)
| Kyle Lowry (8)
| United Center0
| 17–22
|- style="background:#fcc;"
| 40
| March 17
| @ Detroit
| 
| Norman Powell (43)
| Kyle Lowry (6)
| Kyle Lowry (15)
| Little Caesars Arena750
| 17–23
|- style="background:#fcc;"
| 41
| March 19
| Utah
| 
| Pascal Siakam (27)
| Fred VanVleet (6)
| Siakam, VanVleet (9)
| Amalie ArenaN/A
| 17–24
|- style="background:#fcc;"
| 42
| March 21
| @ Cleveland
| 
| Fred VanVleet (23)
| Aron Baynes (9)
| Fred VanVleet (7)
| Rocket Mortgage FieldHouseN/A
| 17–25
|- style="background:#fcc;"
| 43
| March 22
| @ Houston
| 
| Fred VanVleet (27)
| Boucher, Siakam (10)
| Kyle Lowry (8)
| Toyota Center2,965
| 17–26
|- style="background:#cfc;"
| 44
| March 24
| Denver
| 
| Pascal Siakam (27)
| Pascal Siakam (8)
| Kyle Lowry (9)
| Amalie Arena1,578
| 18–26
|- style="background:#fcc;"
| 45
| March 26
| Phoenix
| 
| Pascal Siakam (26)
| Pascal Siakam (11)
| Lowry, Siakam (6)
| Amalie ArenaN/A
| 18–27
|- style="background:#fcc;"
| 46
| March 28
| Portland
| 
| Pascal Siakam (26)
| Chris Boucher (11)
| Fred VanVleet (8)
| Amalie Arena2,021
| 18–28
|- style="background:#fcc;"
| 47
| March 29
| @ Detroit
| 
| Fred VanVleet (22)
| Pascal Siakam (6)
| Siakam, Trent Jr. (5)
| Little Caesars Arena750
| 18–29
|- style="background:#fcc;"
| 48
| March 31
| @ Oklahoma City
| 
| Gary Trent Jr. (31)
| OG Anunoby (11)
| Fred VanVleet (7)
| Chesapeake Energy Arena0
| 18–30

|- style="background:#cfc;"
| 49
| April 2
| Golden State
| 
| Pascal Siakam (36)
| Yuta Watanabe (8)
| Flynn, Siakam (5)
| Amalie Arena3,085
| 19–30
|- style="background:#cfc;"
| 50
| April 5
| Washington
| 
| Pascal Siakam (22)
| Aron Baynes (8)
| DeAndre' Bembry (5)
| Amalie Arena1,620
| 20–30
|- style="background:#fcc;"
| 51
| April 6
| L. A. Lakers
| 
| Pascal Siakam (27)
| Boucher, Flynn (8)
| Malachi Flynn (4)
| Amalie ArenaN/A
| 20–31
|- style="background:#fcc;"
| 52
| April 8
| Chicago
| 
| Chris Boucher (38)
| Chris Boucher (19)
| Malachi Flynn (7)
| Amalie ArenaN/A
| 20–32
|- style="background:#cfc;"
| 53
| April 10
| @ Cleveland
| 
| Gary Trent Jr. (44)
| Gary Trent Jr. (7)
| Malachi Flynn (11)
| Rocket Mortgage FieldHouse4,148
| 21–32
|- style="background:#fcc;"
| 54
| April 11
| @ New York
| 
| Gary Trent Jr. (23)
| Chris Boucher (12)
| Chris Boucher (14)
| Madison Square Garden1,833
| 21–33
|- style="background:#fcc;"
| 55
| April 13
| Atlanta
| 
| Pascal Siakam (30)
| Khem Birch (7)
| Pascal Siakam (7)
| Amalie Arena1,427
| 21–34
|- style="background:#cfc;"
| 56
| April 14
| San Antonio
| 
| OG Anunoby (22)
| Chris Boucher (12)
| Malachi Flynn (7)
| Amalie Arena1,184
| 22–34
|- style="background:#cfc;"
| 57
| April 16
| Orlando
| 
| Paul Watson Jr. (30)
| Boucher, Gillespie (7)
| Malachi Flynn (8)
| Amalie ArenaN/A
| 23–34
|- style="background:#cfc;"
| 58
| April 18
| Oklahoma City
| 
| Chris Boucher (31)
| Chris Boucher (11)
| Flynn, Watson Jr. (5)
| Amalie ArenaN/A
| 24–34
|- style="background:#cfc;"
| 59
| April 21
| Brooklyn
| 
| Pascal Siakam (27)
| Pascal Siakam (9)
| Pascal Siakam (6)
| Amalie ArenaN/A
| 25–34
|- style="background:#fcc;"
| 60
| April 24
| @ New York
| 
| Anunoby, VanVleet (27)
| Birch, Lowry, Siakam (7)
| Fred VanVleet (11)
| Madison Square Garden1,981
| 25–35
|- style="background:#cfc;"
| 61
| April 26
| Cleveland
| 
| Pascal Siakam (25)
| Khem Birch (6)
| Kyle Lowry (10)
| Amalie Arena1,626
| 26–35
|- style="background:#fcc;"
| 62
| April 27
| Brooklyn
| 
| Kyle Lowry (24)
| Khem Birch (14)
| Anunoby, Lowry (6)
| Amalie ArenaN/A
| 26–36
|- style="background:#fcc;"
| 63
| April 29
| @ Denver
| 
| OG Anunoby (25)
| Khem Birch (8)
| Kyle Lowry (7)
| Ball Arena4,025
| 26–37

|- style="background:#fcc;"
| 64
| May 1
| @ Utah
| 
| Fred VanVleet (30)
| Khem Birch (10)
| Fred VanVleet (7)
| Vivint Arena6,506
| 26–38
|- style="background:#cfc;"
| 65
| May 2
| @ L. A. Lakers
| 
| Pascal Siakam (39)
| Pascal Siakam (13)
| Kyle Lowry (11)
| Staples Center2,053
| 27–38
|- style="background:#fcc;"
| 66
| May 4
| @ L. A. Clippers
| 
| Fred VanVleet (27)
| Khem Birch (8)
| Fred VanVleet (13)
| Staples Center1,714
| 27–39
|- style="background:#fcc;"
| 67
| May 6
| Washington
| 
| Pascal Siakam (44)
| Pascal Siakam (11)
| Pascal Siakam (7)
| Amalie Arena2,494
| 27–40
|- style="background:#fcc;"
| 68
| May 8
| Memphis
| 
| Siakam, Trent Jr. (18)
| Freddie Gillespie (8)
| Birch, Harris, Siakam (4)
| Amalie ArenaN/A
| 27–41
|- style="background:#fcc;"
| 69
| May 11
| L. A. Clippers
| 
| Chris Boucher (16)
| Boucher, Gillespie (7)
| Flynn, Harris (4)
| Amalie ArenaN/A
| 27–42
|- style="background:#fcc;"
| 70
| May 13
| @ Chicago
| 
| Stanley Johnson (35)
| Stanley Johnson (10)
| Malachi Flynn (7)
| United Center3,395
| 27–43
|- style="background:#fcc;"
| 71
| May 14
| @ Dallas
| 
| Jalen Harris (31)
| Stanley Johnson (10)
| DeAndre' Bembry (6)
| American Airlines Center4,493
| 27–44
|- style="background:#fcc;"
| 72
| May 16
| Indiana
| 
| Malachi Flynn (27)
| Khem Birch (14)
| Stanley Johnson (7)
| Amalie ArenaN/A
| 27–45

Transactions

Overview

Trades

Free Agency

Re-signed

Additions

Subtractions

See also
Effect of Hurricane Katrina on the New Orleans Hornets, a previous event of an NBA team temporarily displaced, in this instance due to Hurricane Katrina

Notes

References

Toronto Raptors seasons
Toronto Raptors
Toronto Raptors
Toronto Raptors
Basketball in Tampa, Florida